Aboubacar Haïdara (born 20 November 1977) is a Malian footballer. He played in three matches for the Mali national football team from 1999 to 2002. He was also named in Mali's squad for the 2002 African Cup of Nations tournament.

References

External links
 

1977 births
Living people
Malian footballers
Mali international footballers
2002 African Cup of Nations players
Place of birth missing (living people)
Association football midfielders
Al Ittihad Alexandria Club players
Smouha SC players
Tersana SC players
El Entag El Harby SC players
Al Masry SC players
Egyptian Premier League players
Malian expatriate footballers
Malian expatriate sportspeople in Egypt
Expatriate footballers in Egypt
21st-century Malian people